Wahrez (born Boe or Bōē) was a Sasanian general of Daylamite origin, first mentioned in the prelude to the Iberian War and then during the Aksumite–Persian wars.

Name
He was born Boe (Middle Persian: Bōē,  Bōyah/Büyah), which is Hellenized as Boes.

Biography 
Wahrez is first mentioned in the prelude to the Iberian War, where he was sent by the Sasanian king (shah) Kavadh I (r. 498–531) to Caucasian Iberia in order to subdue a revolt under Gurgen. 

During the reign of Kavadh's son, Khosrau I, the Yemenites had requested assistance against Axum dominance, who had occupied large parts of the country. Sayf ibn Dhi-Yazan, the son of Dhu Yazan, went to Khosrau and offered him all of Yemen if his army would defeat the Axumites.

[[File:Balami - Tarikhnama - The arrow of old Wahraz kills Masruq, the Ethiopian King of Yemen (cropped).jpg|thumb|"The arrow of old Wahraz kills Masruq, the Ethiopian King of Yemen", Persian miniature from Tarikh-i Bal'ami]]
Khosrau then sent Wahrez and his son Nawzadh to Yemen at the head of a small expeditionary force, numbering around 800, of low-ranking Azatan (Azadan) nobility. According to other traditions, it consisted of prisoners that were sentenced to death, while according to another version, the force also included (or entirely consisted of) warriors from Daylam and nearby regions. only two out of eight ships (i.e. 600 men) safely reached the Yemeni coast, who joined the local Himyarite allies and invaded the combined forces of the Aksumites, their Himyarite allies, and certain "Bedouins". During the invasion, Nawzadh was killed, which made Wahrez furious at Masruq ibn Abraha, the Axumite ruler of Yemen. Wahrez then met Masruq in battle and killed him with an arrow, which made the Axumites flee. He then conquered Sana'a, where he is known to have refused to lower his banner to enter via the city gate. Wahrez then restored Sayf ibn Dhi-Yazan to his throne as a vassal of the Sasanian Empire.

Al-Tabari reports that the main reason behind victory of Wahrez over the Axumites was the use of the panjagān'' (meaning "having five (arrows?) and probably a ballista equipped with heavy darts), a piece of military technology with which the local peoples were utterly unfamiliar. 

After having conquered Yemen, Wahrez then returned to Persia with a great amount of booty. However, in AD 575 or 578, the vassal king was killed by the Ethiopians, which forced Wahrez to return to Yemen with a force of 4000 men, and expel the Axumites once again. He then made Maʿdī Karib, the son of Sayf, the new king of Yemen. Wahrez was then appointed as governor of Yemen by Khosrau I, which would remain in Sasanian hands until the arrival of Islam. Wahrez was succeeded by his son Marzubān as governor of Yemen.

References

Sources

Further reading 
 

6th-century Iranian people
Daylamites
Sasanian governors of Yemen
Generals of Khosrow I
Abyssinian–Persian wars